Amrai High School, Durgapur is a Bengali-medium senior secondary, co-ed, WBBSE and WBCHSE affiliated school in Durgapur steel city in the state of West Bengal, India.
Amrai High School was established in 1968.

The school has grades 5 to 12 and the language of instruction is Bengali. Students appear for 10+(Madhyamik) examination under West Bengal Board of Secondary Education and 12+(Higher Secondary Examination) examination under West Bengal Council of Higher Secondary Education. Grade 11 and 12 have one streams- Arts.
The school uniform is white shirt and maroon pant for boys and white shirt and maroon skirt for girls from grade 5 to 8. White shirt and pant for boys and white churidar for girls from grade 8 to 12.

See also
 List of schools in India

References

External links 
http://www.wbsed.gov.in/wbsed/default.html
http://www.schoolsworld.in/schools/showschool.php?school_id=19093501204
http://www.icbse.com/schools/amrai-high-school/19093501204
http://schoolspedia.com/website/amrai-high-school-burdwan

Schools in Paschim Bardhaman district
Educational institutions established in 1968
1968 establishments in West Bengal